At least two vessels have been named Garthland, possibly for Garthland Castle. 

  was launched at Chester in 1795 as a West Indiaman. She foundered in December 1821.

Ship names